Jewish Institute for Global Awareness (JIFGA), known before 2015 as Jews Offering New Alternatives for Healing (JONAH), was a Jewish non-profit organization which offered conversion therapy to persons who sought sexual orientation change. JONAH described itself as "dedicated to educating the world-wide Jewish community about the social, cultural and emotional factors which lead to same-sex attractions". JONAH's leaders disagree with the consensus of mainstream science and the world's major mental health organizations who say that non-heterosexual sexual orientation is not a disorder.

In 2015, a landmark trial found that JONAH's claims to be able to change sexual orientation constituted consumer fraud. The organization was ordered to pay restitution to the plaintiffs and shut down within thirty days. Eleven days after the verdict, the founders created a conversion therapy organization called JIFGA using JONAH's assets. In June 2019, a New Jersey judge ordered JIFGA to shut down within thirty days and pay $3.5 million to victims.

History
JONAH was created in 1999 in Jersey City, New Jersey by two married couples, Theodore and Elaine Berk and Arthur and Jane Goldberg. They created the organization after finding out their sons were gay. Arthur Goldberg is a former secretary-treasurer of the National Association for Research & Therapy of Homosexuality. During the 2014 trial against JONAH, it was revealed that Goldberg's license as a board certified professional counselor was revoked in 2011 because the American Psychotherapy Association learned that Goldberg had lied on his application by failing to disclose his felony conviction as a Wall Street municipal bonds manager. In 2000, JONAH provided literature and outreach to gay and bisexual Jews, and their families of all denominations, in New York, New Jersey, and Connecticut, advertising their supposed methods of reducing and eliminating homosexuality. JONAH eventually became a 501(c)(3) non-profit corporation. Since then it expanded to include members in the United States, Israel, Canada, and various European nations.

Trial

On 25 June 2015, in the first-ever trial of conversion therapy in the United States, a New Jersey jury found JONAH guilty of consumer fraud for promising to be able to change its clients' sexual urges and determined its commercial practices to be unconscionable. In a seminal pretrial ruling on 5 February 2015, New Jersey Superior Court Judge Peter Bariso excluded expert testimony from several leading conversion therapy proponents, Joseph Nicolosi and Christopher Doyle, ruling that their opinions were based on the false premise that homosexuality is a disorder. Bariso wrote that "the theory that homosexuality is a disorder is not novel but – like the notion that the earth is flat and the sun revolves around it – instead is outdated and refuted".

On 18 December 2015, Judge Bariso granted a permanent injunction after an agreement by both parties that required JONAH to shut down entirely and prohibited founder Arthur Goldberg and counselor Alan Downing from engaging in any form of conversion therapy in New Jersey.  The jury in the case found unanimously on 25 June that by offering services claiming could turn gay people straight, JONAH committed consumer fraud and engaged in unconscionable commercial practices. Under the agreed to injunction and settlement, the defendants will pay the full  in damages awarded by the jury to compensate the plaintiffs for the fees they paid to JONAH and for remedial mental health counseling for one plaintiff. The proposed judgment includes a $3.5 million award of legal fees. The plaintiffs agreed to accept an undisclosed portion of that award, but the defendants will be liable for the full amount if they violate the agreement.  JONAH is required to shut down all of its operations within 30 days after the order is entered, and its websites and online listservs must be removed. JONAH also will have to liquidate its assets and permanently dissolve as a corporate entity within six months.  As part of the settlement, JONAH will not appeal the jury verdict.

Aftermath
Eleven days after the verdict, JONAH was reincorporated as JIFGA, "Jewish Institute for Global Awareness", keeping JONAH's assets, leadership and operations, as well as the same address and phone number. The Southern Poverty Law Center says that this is an attempt to evade the shutdown order and has appealed to the courts to enforce the previous ruling against JIFGA. In June 2019, a New Jersey judge, Peter F. Bariso Jr., found that JIFGA was an illegitimate attempt to continue JONAH in violation of the court order. He ordered JIFGA to shut down within thirty days and pay 3.5 million fine to victims of the scam. Arthur Goldberg and Elaine Berk are forbidden to serve in executive leadership or on the board of any nonprofit.

Methodology
JONAH emphasized the Talmudic understanding of homosexuality as "being led astray" (Nedarim 51a), and therefore of being able "to return", consistent with the Jewish principle of repentance (teshuvah). According to JONAH, same-sex attractions may be mitigated and potentially eliminated. JONAH employed the techniques of Richard Cohen, an unlicensed counsellor who promotes conversion therapy. Techniques for overcoming homosexual urges included undressing in front of other men, pummeling an effigy of one's mother, and re-enacting traumatic childhood experiences.

Controversy
In July 2010, a video published by the organization Truth Wins Out features two former participants of JONAH, Ben Unger and Chaim Levin, alleging that Alan Downing, a JONAH counselor, demanded that his participants strip off all of their clothing in front of a mirror and touch their genitals in his presence. Downing released a statement in response denying the charges. After emails were sent to the Association of Orthodox Jewish Scientists linking to the video, the organization initially rescinded a previous invitation to JONAH's founder Arthur Goldberg to speak at their annual convention, but later allowed him to speak. Yael Respler of The Jewish Press printed a letter by Goldberg about the incident and noted in response that she herself had engaged in reparative therapy (also called conversion therapy).

On 29 November 2012, the Orthodox Rabbinical Council of America issued a statement clarifying that it did not endorse JONAH'S methods, stating they came to this decision "based on consultation with a wide range of mental health experts and therapists who informed us of the lack of scientifically rigorous studies that support the effectiveness of therapies to change sexual orientation, a review of literature written by experts and major medical and mental health organizations, and based upon reports of the negative and, at times, deleterious consequences to clients of some of the interventions endorsed by JONAH".

Lawsuit
In November 2012, the Southern Poverty Law Center filed the lawsuit Ferguson v. JONAH against JONAH, Goldberg, and Downing on behalf of Michael Ferguson, Ben Unger, Chaim Levin, and two of the participants' mothers for fraudulent practices which are illegal under New Jersey's consumer protection laws. The Southern Poverty Law Center has noted that the lawsuit is "groundbreaking" insofar as it is "the first time a conversion therapy provider has been sued for fraudulent business practices". In 2014 Superior Court Judge Peter Bariso ruled that JONAH and its co-defendants could have to pay three times the cost paid by the participants for therapy they said they needed because of JONAH's conversion therapy.

Testimony at the trial revealed the JONAH program's bizarre and abusive techniques, which included instructing men to undress and instructing one plaintiff to touch his genitals in a private counseling session. JONAH orchestrated violent role-play exercises, encouraging clients to beat effigies of their mothers, who were sometimes blamed for their sons' homosexuality. Male counselors advocated "healthy touch" sessions that included prolonged cuddling. JONAH's tactics alienated some clients from their families and caused them to blame themselves or family members for their sexual orientation.

In February 2015, Hudson County, New Jersey Superior Court Judge Peter Bariso said that JONAH's claims of gay conversion therapy that describe homosexuality as a curable mental disorder were illegal based on the state's Consumer Fraud Act. Judge Bariso also said it is fraudulent to offer "success statistics" because "there is no factual basis for calculating such statistics". The judge also excluded expert testimony from leading conversion therapy proponents, Joseph Nicolosi and Christopher Doyle, ruling that their opinions were based on the false premise that homosexuality is a disorder. Bariso wrote that "the theory that homosexuality is a disorder is not novel but – like the notion that the earth is flat and the sun revolves around it – instead is outdated and refuted".

In response to Judge Bariso's ruling, David Dinielli, deputy legal director for the Southern Poverty Law Center, said, "This is the principal lie the conversion therapy industry uses throughout the country to peddle its quackery to vulnerable clients. Gay people don't need to be cured, and we are thrilled that the court has recognized this".

Ruling
On 25 June 2015 a jury of seven voted unanimously to convict JONAH under the Consumer Fraud Act of New Jersey. The jury also found that JONAH's practices were unconscionable business practices. The verdict required JONAH and Downing to refund thousands of dollars paid by former clients.

On 18 December 2015, Judge Bariso granted a permanent injunction after an agreement by both parties that required JONAH to shut down entirely and prohibited founder Arthur Goldberg and counselor Alan Downing from engaging in any form of conversion therapy in New Jersey.  The jury in the case found unanimously on 25 June that by offering services claiming could turn gay people straight, JONAH committed consumer fraud and engaged in unconscionable commercial practices. Under the agreed to injunction and settlement, the defendants will pay the full  in damages awarded by the jury to compensate the plaintiffs for the fees they paid to JONAH and for remedial mental health counseling for one plaintiff. The proposed judgment includes a $3.5 million award of legal fees. The plaintiffs agreed to accept an undisclosed portion of that award, but the defendants will be liable for the full amount if they violate the agreement.  JONAH is required to shut down all of its operations within 30 days after the order is entered, and its websites and online listservs must be removed. JONAH also will have to liquidate its assets and permanently dissolve as a corporate entity within six months.  As part of the settlement, JONAH will not appeal the jury verdict.

See also

Atzat Nefesh
Ex-Ex-Gay
Ex-gay movement
GLAAD
Homophobia
Persecution of Homosexuals in Nazi Germany
Matthew Shepard Foundation
Recovering from Religion
The Trevor Project

Notes

References

External links

1999 establishments in New Jersey
Consumer fraud
Conversion therapy organizations
LGBT and Judaism
Judaism and sexuality
Jewish organizations established in 1999
2015 disestablishments in New Jersey
2019 disestablishments in New Jersey
Religious organizations disestablished in 2015
Religious organizations disestablished in 2019